This is a list of fictional humanoid species originating in video games, and is subsidiary to lists of humanoids. It is a collection of various notable humanoid species that are featured in video games, including arcade games, personal computer games, or console games.

References

Video games